Hypostomus aspilogaster, known as the Jacuhy pleco, is a species of catfish in the family Loricariidae. It is native to South America, where it occurs in the drainage basins of the Uruguay River and the Lagoa dos Patos. The species reaches 26.5 cm (10.4 inches) in standard length and is believed to be a facultative air-breather.

References 

aspilogaster
Fish described in 1894